In mathematics, Mumford's compactness theorem states that the space of compact Riemann surfaces of fixed genus g > 1 with no closed geodesics of length less than some fixed ε > 0 in the Poincaré metric is compact.

References

Riemann surfaces
Kleinian groups
Compactness theorems